= Hollyhill Hummingbird Farm =

Nonprofit corporation

Hollyhill Hummingbird Farm, a 501(c)(3) Nonprofit corporation, is an educational farm located in Santa Rosa, California. Its focus is on biodynamics, sustainability, and the ethical treatment of life.

The Farm was founded in 2011, by Dave West, an aerospace engineer. The original location of the farm was at the corner of Rainbow Dr and Bubb Rd in Cupertino, California. The farm moved in 2015 to Santa Rosa, California.

Hollyhill Hummingbird Farm's symbol of a hummingbird comes from the philosophy of symbiosis. The Farm grows fruit, vegetables, nuts, herbs, and grains with the help of community volunteers.
